The 8.8 cm SK L/30 (SK - Schnelladekanone (quick loading cannon) L - Länge (with a 30-caliber barrel) was a German naval gun that was used in World War I on a variety of mounts.

Description
It used the Krupp horizontal sliding block, or "wedge", as it is sometimes referred to, breech design. In addition to mounts for surface ships there was also a submarine version which was on either a retractable or fixed pivot mount. The Krupp mount retracted vertically through a hatch, while the Erhardt version folded down onto the ship's deck.

Naval service
The 8.8 cm SK L/30 was a widely used naval gun on World War I pre-dreadnoughts, cruisers, coastal defence ships, avisos, submarines and torpedo boats in both casemates and turrets.  Its primary use on pre-dreadnoughts, cruisers and coastal defence ships was as an anti-torpedo boat gun, while on avisos, submarines and torpedo boats it was their secondary armament.

Ship classes that carried the 8.8 cm SK L/30 include:

See also
 List of naval guns
 8.8 cm SK C/30 naval gun: later development of similar calibre weapon, made in 1930

Notes

References

External links
 SK L/30 at Navweaps.com

88 mm artillery
Naval guns of Germany